Norway was the host nation for the 1994 Winter Olympics in Lillehammer.  It was the second time that Norway had hosted the Winter Olympic Games, after the 1952 Games in Oslo.  In 1994, Norway finished second in the medal ranking to Russia, with strong results in the skiing events.

During the games, Norway set a record: most gold medals won by a host nation, with 10. The United States tied it when they hosted the 2002 Winter Olympics in Salt Lake City, but Canada broke it during the 2010 Winter Olympics in Vancouver.

Medalists

Competitors
The following is the list of number of competitors in the Games.

Alpine skiing

Men

Men's combined

Women

Women's combined

Biathlon

Men

Men's 4 × 7.5 km relay

Women

Women's 4 × 7.5 km relay

 1 A penalty loop of 150 metres had to be skied per missed target.
 2 One minute added per missed target.

Cross-country skiing

Men

 1 Starting delay based on 10 km results. 
 C = Classical style, F = Freestyle

Men's 4 × 10 km relay

Women

 2 Starting delay based on 5 km results. 
 C = Classical style, F = Freestyle

Women's 4 × 5 km relay

Freestyle skiing

Men

Women

Ice hockey

Group A
Twelve participating teams were placed in the two groups. After playing a round-robin, the top four teams in each group advanced to the Medal Round while the last two teams competed in the consolation round for the 9th to 12th places.

consolation round

|}

11th place match

|}

Team roster
Jim Marthinsen (G)
Rob Schistad (G)
Petter Salsten (D)
Morgan Andersen (D)
Tommy Jakobsen (D)
Jan-Roar Fagerli (D)
Svein Enok Nørstebø (D)
Svenn Erik Bjørnstad (D)
Geir Hoff (F)
Vegar Barlie (F)
Lars Håkon Andersen (F)
Ole Eskild Dahlstrøm (F)
Arne Billkvam (F)
Erik Kristiansen (F)
Trond Magnussen (F)
Petter Thoresen (F)
Morten Finstad (F)
Roy Johansen (F)
Tom Johansen (F)
Marius Rath (F)
Espen Knutsen (F)
Head coach: Bengt Ohlson

Luge

(Men's) Doubles

Women

Nordic combined 

Men's individual

Events:
 normal hill ski jumping
 15 km cross-country skiing 

Men's Team

Three participants per team.

Events:
 normal hill ski jumping
 10 km cross-country skiing

Short track speed skating

Men

Ski jumping 

Men's team large hill

 1 Four teams members performed two jumps each.

Speed skating

Men

Women

Notes

References
 Official Olympic Reports
 International Olympic Committee results database
 Olympic Winter Games 1994, full results by sports-reference.com

Nations at the 1994 Winter Olympics
1994
1994 in Norwegian sport